Afghan Refugee Camp ( – Ardūgāh Afāghaneh) is a village and refugee camp in Mashiz Rural District, in the Central District of Bardsir County, Kerman Province, Iran. At the 2006 census, its population was 7,679, in 1,545 families.

References 

Populated places in Bardsir County